VIJ Stadium was used by the Dutch East Indies football club Voetbalbond Indonesische Jacatra (VIJ), which was founded in 1928, and in 1950 the stadium was renamed Persija Jakarta.

VIJ Stadium become a football club history of Jakarta, Persija. Before independence, the stadium was built to compete with indigenous youth football club Netherlands in Indonesia, NIVB. When it NIVB or Nederlandsch Indie Voetbal Bond in the form of 1918 consisted of Dutch people standing anti-indigenous players.

Feeling discriminated, a number of Indonesian youth with the establish VIJ headquartered in Petojo in 1928. Due become the club's headquarters VIJ then this field ball field named VIJ.

The stadium was built by the builder Persija then, MH Thamrin worth of 2000 Gulden be fully used by an association football indigenous, this field is used by the association football first native in Jakarta, namely VIJ. Love MH Thamrin on folk indigenous in land of his birth, Jakarta, be realized with his support for VIJ who moment it become a reflection "Indonesia" basis small. VIJ is symbol of resistance citizens of indigenous against the government colonial, with the not wearing name of Batavia in the name of this association. In this stadium, VIJ claimed four titles champion in the year 1931, 1933, 1934 and 1938, and featured indigenous talent such as Roeljaman, Iskandar, A. Gani, Djaimin, Moestari, and Soetarno. Field Petojo who now named Field VIJ is form of history who at this time still standing amid the denseness city, when first tree—tree or buildings cinema Roxy who accompany the pitch this, now home—houses in her rundown settlements the citizens become grounds keepers this.

In 1950, VIJ was officially named Persija and moved his base to the field Menteng, Jakarta. VIJ Field while still standing as the surrounding community sports facilities. "Until 1980 this field to become redeveloped stadium. Stake was handed over to the government of Jakarta," said Marlan, a field manager.

According to Marlan, VIJ has a broad field stadium with a length of 110 meters and width of 70 meters. The facilities are available in addition to the football field and locker room seats with the spectators capacity of approximately 500 people. Uniquely the south wall of the fence, directly adjacent to the building of houses.

VIJ Field remains in good condition. Although some grass on the pitch looks bare, but there is enough support facilities. According to Marlan, during the era of the Dutch government, this field was just a grassy field which become the base for Club VIJ. In 1980, the field underwent refurbishment and is now under the direct management responsibility of the government of Jakarta.

References

central Jakarta
Persija Jakarta
Sports venues in Jakarta